The 1947–48 Rochester Royals season was the franchise's third season in the National Basketball League (NBL). The team finished with a 44-16 record, the best record in the league. The team lost the NBL Championship for the second straight year.

League standings

Eastern standings

Western Division

Team statistics

Regular season

Playoffs

Awards and honors
1st Team: Al Cervi, Red Holzman
2nd Team: Bob Davies

Transactions

References

Sacramento Kings seasons
Rochester
Rochester Royals
Rochester Royals